The Brass era  Robie cyclecar was manufactured by the Robie Motor Car Company in Chicago, Illinois in 1914.

History 
The Robie used a 4-cylinder Perkins engine of 1.6 liters. It was a side-by-side two-seater.  It had a rounded radiator with a streamline body and disc wheels. The Robie was priced at $450, . The car was guaranteed to go 45mph and 45mpg of gasoline.

Fred G. Robie had been in the automobile accessories business before building his cyclecar.  The Robie was built by Massnick-Phipps Manufacturing company in Detroit Michigan. Robie planned to have a second generation of his cyclecar built by Pullman in York, Pennsylvania, but his money ran out.

References

Defunct motor vehicle manufacturers of the United States
Motor vehicle manufacturers based in Illinois
Vehicle manufacturing companies established in 1914
Vehicle manufacturing companies disestablished in 1915
Cyclecars
Brass Era vehicles
1910s cars
Cars introduced in 1914